The sthène (symbol sn), sometimes spelled (or misspelled) sthéne or sthene (from ), is an obsolete unit of force or thrust in the metre–tonne–second system of units (mts) introduced in France in 1919. When proposed by the British Association in 1876, it was called the funal, but the name was changed by 1914. The mts system was abandoned in favour of the mks system and has now been superseded by the International System of Units.

{|
|-
|rowspan=4 valign=top|1 sthène
|= 1 kilonewton
|-
|≈ 
|-
|≈ 
|-
|≈ 
|}

References

Obsolete units of measurement
Units of force
Non-SI metric units
Metre–tonne–second system of units